Rawling is a British surname that may refer to
Brian Rawling,  British record producer and songwriter
Cecil Rawling (1870–1917), British soldier, explorer and author
John Rawling, British boxing, athletics, darts and yachting commentator
Monica Rawling, a fictional character from the FX television show The Shield
Tom Rawling (1916–1996), British teacher and poet

See also
Rawlings

English-language surnames